Urolepis is a genus of South American plants in the tribe Eupatorieae within the family Asteraceae.

Species
The only known species is Urolepis hecatantha, native to Paraguay, Uruguay, Bolivia, northern Argentina (Provinces of Salta, Jujuy, Chaco, Entre Ríos, Misiones, Corrientes, Buenos Aires, Tucumán), and southern Brazil (States of Paraná, Rio Grande do Sul, Santa Catarina, Minas Gerais, Rio de Janeiro, São Paulo).

References

Flora of South America
Eupatorieae